Events in the year 1857 in Belgium.

Incumbents
Monarch: Leopold I
Head of government: Pierre de Decker (to 9 November); Charles Rogier (from 9 November)

Events
 Jean Neuhaus opens an apothecary shop in Galeries Royales Saint-Hubert
 28 May – Liberal protests near the Palace of the Nation against a proposed "convents" law that would give the Catholic Church more power to manage charitable foundations.
 27 October – Municipal elections, giving a liberal victory.
 30 October – Pierre de Decker's ministry resigns.
 10 December – Snap legislative elections, giving a liberal victory.

Publications
Periodicals
 Almanach de poche de Bruxelles (Brussels, M. E. Rampelbergh)
 Almanach du commerce et de l'industrie (Brussels, H. Tarlier)
 Annales de pomologie belge et étrangère, vol. 5.
 Annuaire de la noblesse de Belgique, vol. 11, edited by Isidore de Stein d'Altenstein
 Annuaire statistique et historique belge, vol. 4, edited by Auguste Scheler
 Annuaire de l'Académie royale de Belgique, vol. 23
 La Belgique, 4
 La Belgique Horticole, vol. 7.
 Bulletin de l'Académie royale de médecine de Belgique, ser. 2, vol. 1.
 Bulletins de l'Académie royale des sciences et belles-lettres de Bruxelles, vol. 3 (Brussels, Hayez).
 Collection de précis historiques, vol. 6, edited by Edouard Terwecoren S.J.
 Journal de l'armée belge, vols. 13-14
 Journal d'horticulture pratique de la Belgique
 De toekomst: tijdschrift voor opvoeding en onderwijs begins publication

Official reports and monographs
 Recueil consulaire contenant les rapports commerciaux
 Recueil des lois et arrêtés royaux de la Belgique, vol. 9
 Joseph Jean De Smet, Vie de Saint-Liévin, patron de Gand et apôtre du pays d'Alost (Ghent)
 Jean-Joseph Thonissen, La Belgique sous le règne de Léopold I, vol. 3 (Liège, J.-G. Lardinois)

Guidebooks and directories
 David Bogue, Belgium and the Rhine (London, Lee and Carter).

Literature
 Frans de Cort, Liederen, eerste reeks (Antwerp)

Births
 12 January – Léon de Witte de Haelen, general (died 1933)
 21 February – Jules de Trooz, politician (died 1907)
 18 March – César Thomson, violinist (died 1931)
 8 April – Marie Louise De Meester, religious foundress (died 1928)
 27 April – Louis-Napoléon Chaltin, colonial officer (died 1933)
 11 August – Cyriaque Gillain, general (died 1931)
 25 August – Louis-Gustave Amelot, engineer (died 1884)
 28 August – Auguste Goffinet, courtier (died 1927)

Deaths
 4 January – François-Jean Wyns de Raucour (born 1779), politician
 7 February – Félix de Mérode (born 1791), politician
 28 February – André Dumont (born 1809), geologist
 3 May – Jean Baptiste Smits (born 1792), politician

References

 
Belgium
Years of the 19th century in Belgium
1850s in Belgium
Belgium